Worm's Eye View is a 1951 British Technicolor comedy film directed by Jack Raymond and starring Ronald Shiner as Sam Porter and Diana Dors as Thelma. Based on the successful play of the same name by R.F. Delderfield, it was produced by Henry Halsted and Byron Film.

Premise
The film is set in a family home during World War II. Their bitter landlady is not pleased by five fighters from the Royal Air Force who are staying there and she re-directs unjustly her frustrations against the family. Part of the film appears in Rise and Shiner.

Cast
 Ronald Shiner as Sam Porter
 Garry Marsh as Pop Brownlow
 Diana Dors as Thelma
 John Blythe as Duke
 Bruce Seton as Squadron Leader Briarly
 Digby Wolfe as Corporal Mark Trelawney
 Eric Davies as Taffy
 Everley Gregg as Mrs. Bounty
 Christina Forrest as Bella Bounty
 Jonathan Field as Sydney
 William Percy as Mr Bounty

Production
Filming took place at Hammersmith in late 1950.

Reception
TV Guide wrote, "some mild amusement is to be found here, particularly in the dialogue, though all in all this is nothing special. British filmgoers thought otherwise, though, making both the film and Shiner big successes."

Worm's Eye View was the sixth most popular film at the British box office in 1951.

References

External links
 
 
 

1951 films
1951 comedy films
Films directed by Jack Raymond
British comedy films
1950s English-language films
1950s British films